NPSG or NpSG may refer to:

 Neue-psychoaktive-Stoffe-Gesetz (NpSG), a German drug law governing research chemicals
 North Pacific Subtropical Gyre, a system of circulating ocean currents in the North Pacific Ocean